The  is a performance-oriented variant of the XP210 series Yaris supermini/subcompact hatchback, in a segment commonly called the hot hatch. The vehicle is manufactured by Toyota with assistance from the company's Gazoo Racing (GR) division and being produced to meet World Rally Championship (WRC) homologation rules.

Overview 
When the XP210 Yaris hatchback was developed, Toyota decided to only offer it in a five-door bodywork, as three-door hatchbacks had been diminishing in popularity. While the decision made financial sense, it posed a problem for Toyota's WRC team, which felt only a three-door hatch was suitable for competition.

Despite the expense of developing a limited-production performance model, Toyota CEO Akio Toyoda felt strongly that it was important for the company to still be represented at the WRC, so he authorised the development of the GR Yaris. Toyoda would later say that he saw the GR Yaris as a passion project of his, stemming from a desire for the automaker to develop and build a sports car purely of its own design, unlike the 86 (jointly developed with and built by Subaru) or the GR Supra (jointly developed with BMW and built by Magna Steyr).

Design 

To meet the WRC's homologation rules Toyota would need to produce at least 2,500 units of the GR Yaris in a continuous 12-month period, although this is claimed to be 25,000 by Toyota. Rally cars homologated for the WRC are required to use the same basic bodyshell as a production car and the standard XP210 series Yaris is only available with a five-door body which Toyota and Toyoda felt wasn't appropriate. The Gazoo Racing WRT team, led by team principal and 4-time WRC champion Tommi Mäkinen, was heavily involved in the design. The challenge was to build a car that was capable of being equipped to race at WRC events, but also suitable for daily driving.

Working together with the rally team, the Gazoo Racing division built prototypes and development mules by heavily modifying production Yaris vehicles that were then reverse-engineered into a car that would work for the average customer. Both Toyoda and Mäkinen spent time test driving these development mules and pre-production cars in the snow, on gravel and on the street.

One of the major changes came when the team decided they wanted the three-door hatchback to have four-wheel drive, a wider rear track and a double wishbone suspension layout to handle significantly increased torque. The design changes required that the GR Yaris be built on a combination between the front end of the standard Yaris' GA-B architecture with the rear of the GA-C platform used by the Corolla, among other Toyota products. To save weight, the GR Yaris also uses aluminium for the front bonnet (hood), boot (trunk) lid and door panels. It also uses carbon fibre-reinforced plastic for its roof panel which was formed using the sheet molding compound method. Ultimately, chief engineer Naohiko Saito said he was able to accommodate 90 percent of design requests made by Mäkinen and the WRC team.

The engine is mated to a 6-speed V16-series intelligent manual transmission ("iMT") and "GR-Four" permanent four-wheel drive system.

The GR Yaris was unveiled at the 2020 Tokyo Auto Salon, and is sold in Japan, Europe, Australia, New Zealand, South Africa, Thailand, Malaysia, Indonesia, Singapore, the Philippines, Mexico, Argentina and Taiwan. The GR Yaris has not been offered in the United States or Canada; analysts attribute this to its low probable sales volume, the discontinuation of the standard Yaris in these markets, and a lack of commonality with the most recent Yaris sold in the region, which was a rebadged and slightly restyled Mazda2. Both regions received the larger, five-door GR Corolla instead.

GR Yaris RS 
Exclusive for the Japanese market, Toyota offers an entry-level, front-wheel drive GR Yaris RS. As it lacks the four-wheel drive system, the "GR-Four" emblem is eliminated, but otherwise the exterior bodywork of the RS is identical to the standard RZ trim level. Under the bonnet, the GR-built engine is replaced with a more regular Dynamic Force engine, the three-cylinder, naturally-aspirated, 1.5-litre,  M15A-FKS, which is mated to the K120 "Direct Shift" continuously variable transmission (CVT). The Direct Shift CVT includes a physical first gear (known as a "launch gear") and nine additional simulated gears, for a total of ten. The RS also uses the braking system found in the regular Yaris models. However, the rear double wishbone suspension system is retained. Weighing , it is  lighter than the RZ trim and the international GR Yaris model, which weighs .

Special editions

GRMN Yaris (2022) 

The GRMN Yaris ("GRMN" for Gazoo Racing, tuned by the Meister of the Nürburgring) is a limited-production (500 units) variant based on the GR Yaris RZ with:
 Retuned close-ratio gear transmission and a low final gear set. The SNCM material was used and shot processing was added to first, third, fourth, fifth and final gears, which is claimed to significantly improving shock torque and fatigue strength.
 Reinforced metal clutch on the dual-mass flywheel.
 Increased number of spot welds by 545 and enhanced body rigidity by applying additional  of structural adhesive.

Apart from the regular GRMN Yaris, "Circuit Package" and "Rally Package" options were also available. The Circuit Package includes BBS GRMN bespoke 18-inch wheels, 18-inch brakes, Bilstein shock absorbers with adjustable damping force, carbon (twill weave CFRP) rear spoiler, side skirt and lip spoiler, while the Rally Package includes GR shock absorbers and short stabilizer link set, GR under guard set and GR roll bar (with side bar). Rally Package parts could be chosen separately.

The vehicle was unveiled at the 2022 Tokyo Auto Salon. Sales will begin in the first quarter of 2022, with preorder beginning on 14 January 2022.

Concept models

GR Yaris Hydrogen 
The GR Yaris Hydrogen is a GR Yaris with a modified G16E-GTS engine to run with hydrogen fuel.

Motorsport 

The GR Yaris served as the basis for the GR Yaris Rally1 car that made its debut in 2022 World Rally Championship season. It will also make its Rally2 debut in 2024.

Awards 
In January 2021, the GR Yaris was named Hot Hatch of the Year by What Car? magazine. What Car? awarded the GR Yaris five stars out of five in its review of the car.

The GR Yaris was awarded the 2021 UK Car of the Year, as well as winning the Best Performance award.

Production 
The GR Yaris went into production in September 2020 on a dedicated assembly line in the Motomachi plant, that Toyota calls the "GR Factory" and is staffed by master craftsman team members.

On 30 July 2021, the production of GR Yaris would be extended for two years due to strong demand for the vehicle.

Promotion 
In September 2020, a television commercial was launched to promote the car, starring former UCLA gymnast Katelyn Ohashi and the song Out of the Sky by Canadian band Random Recipe . In the advert, Ohashi is seen performing a plethera of cartwheels, spins and somersaults down Riebeek Street in Cape Town. She then leaps into the air before coming back down as a Yaris.

References

External links 

  (GR Yaris)
  (GRMN Yaris)

GR Yaris
Cars introduced in 2020
Subcompact cars
Hot hatches
All-wheel-drive vehicles
Front-wheel-drive vehicles
Vehicles with CVT transmission